"Des pères, des hommes et des frères" is a single by Canadian singer Corneille featuring French rapper La Fouine, and produced by Marco Volcy. Released on 24 October 2011 by Wagram Music, it peaked at number 2 on the Belgian Ultratip 50 Singles Chart in Wallonia, and at number 25 on the French Singles Chart.

Music video
The music video for the song was shot in Montréal, Québec, and was released on 10 October 2011, before the single's release.

Track listing
 Digital download
 "Des pères, des hommes et des frères" (featuring La Fouine) – 3:56

Chart performance

References

2011 singles
2011 songs
Corneille (singer) songs
La Fouine songs